Anne Farquhar (born 1948), is a female former athlete who competed for England.

Athletics career
She represented England and won a silver medal in the javelin, at the 1970 British Commonwealth Games in Edinburgh, Scotland.

In 1978 she became English champion.

References

1948 births
English female javelin throwers
Commonwealth Games medallists in athletics
Commonwealth Games silver medallists for England
Athletes (track and field) at the 1970 British Commonwealth Games
Living people
Medallists at the 1970 British Commonwealth Games